El crisol is a Mexican telenovela produced by Televisa for Telesistema Mexicano in 1964.

Cast 
Tony Carbajal
Teresa Grobois
Alicia Gutiérrez
Manuel López Ochoa
Emma Roldán
Luis Aragón
Noé Murayama
Elodia Hernández
Alicia Montoya
María Esquivel

References

External links 

Mexican telenovelas
1964 telenovelas
Televisa telenovelas
1964 Mexican television series debuts
1964 Mexican television series endings
Spanish-language telenovelas